Hibbertia dilatata is a species of flowering plant in the family Dilleniaceae and is endemic to the Northern Territory. It is a sub-shrub with flattened stems and pale to bright pink, purplish or white flowers with seven to ten stamens.

Description
There are between seven and ten stamens and two staminodes. Flowering occurs throughout the year.

Taxonomy
This species was first formally described in 1863 by George Bentham in Flora Australiensis and given the name Pachynema dilatatum from a specimen collected by Ferdinand von Mueller on the Macadam Range. In 2009, James W. Horn changed the name to Hibbertia dilatata in the International Journal of Plant Sciences on the basis of phylogenetic studies.

Distribution and habitat
Hibbertia dilatata grows in woodland usually on shallow sandy soil in the northern part of the Northern Territory.

Conservation status
Hibbertia dilatata is classified as of "least concern" under the Northern Territory Government Territory Parks and Wildlife Conservation Act 1976.

See also
List of Hibbertia species

References

dilatata
Flora of the Northern Territory
Plants described in 1863
Taxa named by George Bentham